TRNA (cytidine32/guanosine34-2'-O)-methyltransferase (Trm7p) is an enzyme with systematic name S-adenosyl-L-methionine:tRNA (cytidine32/guanosine34-2'-O)-methyltransferase. This enzyme catalyses the following chemical reaction

 S-adenosyl-L-methionine + cytidine32/guanosine34 in tRNA  S-adenosyl-L-homocysteine + 2'-O-methylcytidine32/2'-O-methylguanosine34 in tRNA

The enzyme from Saccharomyces cerevisiae catalyses the formation of 2'-O-methylnucleotides at positions 32 and 34 of the yeast tRNAPhe and tRNATrp.

References

External links 
 

EC 2.1.1